Dale Anthony Gorman (born 28 June 1996) is a Northern Irish professional footballer who plays as a midfielder and captains Barnet.

Gorman began his career at hometown club Letterkenny Rovers before signing a scholarship with Stevenage in 2013. He broke into the Stevenage first-team during the 2015–16 season and spent three seasons in the first-team before leaving in May 2018. Gorman joined Leyton Orient of the National League ahead of the 2018–19 season, where he helped the club earn promotion back to the Football League in his first season there. He spent two seasons at Leyton Orient, during which he also spent time on loan at Newport County, before being released in June 2020. Gorman signed for Glentoran of the NIFL Premiership in September 2020. He has also represented Northern Ireland at under-17, under-19 and under-21 level.

Early life
Gorman is the son of Sheila and coach and former Finn Harps player Anthony Gorman. He has two younger brothers called Zach and Joel. Gorman attended St Eunan's College for his secondary education. During his time there he captained the school team and played alongside Shaun Patton.

Club career

Early career
Gorman began his career with his hometown club, Letterkenny Rovers. He attracted the attention of English club Stevenage after being scouted in a Northern Ireland under-17 match against Scotland. After Gorman had finished competing in qualifying for the 2013 European under-17 Championships, he was invited to train at Stevenage's academy, playing in a youth game against Bournemouth. He scored one goal and assisted another in the match, and he was subsequently offered a two-year scholarship. He signed the deal immediately, calling it a "no-brainer". His parents also had relatives living near the club.

Stevenage
Gorman officially joined Stevenage in May 2013, and spent the following two seasons in the club's youth set-up, competing for the club's under-18 and reserve teams, as well as playing at the IMG Cup in Florida for the Hertfordshire club. During his two years at academy level, Gorman also frequently trained with the first-team. In May 2015, he signed his first professional contract with the club.

Ahead of the 2015–16 season, Gorman featured in several of Stevenage's pre-season fixtures under new manager Teddy Sheringham. He made his professional debut in the club's second game of the new campaign, coming on as a second-half substitute in Stevenage's 2–1 away loss to Ipswich Town in the League Cup on 11 August 2015. Gorman made his first start a week-and-a-half later, playing the whole game as Stevenage secured their first win of the season courtesy of a 2–0 victory over Hartlepool United at Broadhall Way. Having made five first-team appearances during the first half of the season, Gorman signed an improved three-year contract with Stevenage in December 2015. He went on to make 14 appearances during his first season in professional football.

The 2016–17 season served as Gorman's breakthrough campaign as a first-team regular. His first appearance of the new season came at Portman Road in an EFL Cup game away at Championship opposition Ipswich Town, the same match and venue where he made his professional debut a year earlier. He played the whole match in a 1–0 Stevenage victory. It marked the start of a run of games in the first-team for the midfielder, and he scored his first professional goal on 17 December 2016, with a "curling strike" in a 2–1 away victory against local rivals Barnet. The following month, on 9 January 2017, Gorman signed a new contract with the club, running until 2019. Gorman scored once in 30 appearances during the season as the club finished in 10th-place in League Two. He made 27 appearances in all competitions during the 2017–18 season, scoring twice, as Stevenage finished the League Two campaign in 16th position. He was released in May 2018.

Leyton Orient
Following his departure from Stevenage, Gorman signed for National League club Leyton Orient on a two-year deal on 14 June 2018. He scored his first goal for Orient when he scored in an EFL Trophy tie against Southend United on 3 September 2019. On 10 January 2020 Gorman joined Newport County on loan for the remainder of the 2019-20 season.  He made his debut for Newport County on 18 January 2020 in the 2-0 League Two win against Swindon Town as a second half substitute. He scored his first goal for Newport on 7 March 2020 in the 1-0 League Two win against Morecambe. He was released by Leyton Orient in June 2020 after his contract expired.

Glentoran
Gorman joined NIFL Premiership club Glentoran on 2 September 2020.

Yeovil Town
On 22 July 2021, Gorman signed for National League club Yeovil Town for an undisclosed fee. At the end of the 2021–22 season, Gorman rejected the offer of a new contract from Yeovil and departed following the expiry of his contract.

Barnet
On 2 July 2022, Gorman signed for Barnet.

International career
Gorman decided to play for Northern Ireland in order to further his prospects of gaining a move to an English club. Having earned six caps for Northern Ireland's under-17 team from October 2012 to March 2013, Gorman made the step up to under-19 level following his move to Stevenage in the summer of 2013, receiving his first call-up at under-19 level in October 2013, and made three appearances at that level over the space of a year. A month after making his professional debut at Stevenage, Gorman was called up to the Northern Ireland under-21 team,  making his debut on 5 September 2015, a game in which he was sent off for two bookable offences in a 2–1 home defeat to Scotland under-21s.

Career statistics

Honours
Leyton Orient
National League: 2018–19

References

External links

 

1996 births
Living people
Association footballers from County Donegal
Association football midfielders
English Football League players
National League (English football) players
NIFL Premiership players
Letterkenny Rovers F.C. players
Leyton Orient F.C. players
Northern Ireland under-21 international footballers
People educated at St Eunan's College
People from Letterkenny
Republic of Ireland association footballers
Stevenage F.C. players
Newport County A.F.C. players
Glentoran F.C. players
Yeovil Town F.C. players
Barnet F.C. players